is a village located in Yamagata Prefecture, Japan. ,  the village had an estimated population of 4,431 in 1602 households,   and a population density of 17 persons per km².

Geography
Tozawa is located in north-central eastern Yamagata Prefecture, bordered to the east by the Dewa Mountains. The Mogami River runs through the village.

Neighboring municipalities
Yamagata Prefecture
Shinjō
Sakata
Sakegawa
Shōnai
Ōkura

Climate
Tozawa  has a Humid continental climate (Köppen climate classification Cfa) with large seasonal temperature differences, with warm to hot (and often humid) summers and cold (sometimes severely cold) winters. Precipitation is significant throughout the year, but is heaviest from August to October. The average annual temperature in Tozawa is 11.1 °C. The average annual rainfall is 1877 mm with September as the wettest month. The temperatures are highest on average in August, at around 24.6 °C, and lowest in January, at around -1.1 °C.

History
The area of present-day was Tozawa part of ancient Dewa Province and during the Nara Period and early Heian period was an important fortified point on the road connecting Akita Castle on the Sea of Japan with Tagajo on the Pacific Ocean. During the Sengoku period, the area was under the control of the Mogami clan. During the Edo period, the village was a river port on the Mogami River.  After the start of the Meiji period, the area became part of Mogami District, Yamagata Prefecture. The village of Tozawa was established on April 1, 1889 with the establishment of the modern municipalities system. It absorbed the neighboring villages of Furukuchi and Kadokawa in 1955.

Demographics
Per Japanese census data, the population of Tozawa peaked around the year 1950 and has declined since then. It is now less than half what it was a century ago.

Economy
The main industry is agriculture, livestock and forestry.

Education
Tozawa has one combined public elementary/middle school operated by the village government. The village does not have a high school.

Transportation

Railways
 East Japan Railway Company -  Rikuu West Line
 -  -

Highways

Local attractions
Shiraito Falls – one of Japan's Top 100 Waterfalls

Sister city relations
 – General Trias, Cavite, Philippines

References

External links

Official Website  

 
Villages in Yamagata Prefecture